The Italian Hockey League is the second level of ice hockey in Italy. The league was founded in 1934. 

The league changed his name several times:
Serie B (1934–1941)
Campionato italiano di promozione (1948–1965)
Serie B (1965–1996. divided in Serie B1 and Serie B2 between 1988 and 1996)
Serie A2 (1996–1997)
Serie B (1997–1998)
Serie A2 (1998–2000)
Serie B (2000–2002)
Serie A2 (2002–2003)
Serie B (2003–2004)
Serie A2 (2004–2013)
Seconda divisione (2013–2014)
Serie B (2014–2017)
Italian Hockey League (2017–present)

Champions
1935: HC Milano II
1936: ADG Milano
1937: ?
1938: AMDG Milano II
1939: ?
1940: ?
1941: ?
1942: not awarded
1943: not awarded
1944: not awarded
1945: not awarded
1946: not awarded
1947: Misurina
1947–1948: ?
1948–1949: Ortisei II
1949–1950: ?
1950–1951: Saslong Santa Cristina
1951–1952: Saslong Santa Cristina
1952–1953: Valpellice
1953–1954: HC Torino
1954–1955: Asiago
1955–1956: Latemar
1956–1957: Scoiattoli Bolzano
1957–1958: Amatori Milano
1958–1959: Amatori Milano
1959–1960: Amatori Milano
1960–1961: Latemar
1961–1962: SSV Bolzano
1962–1963: Alleghe
1963–1964: Alleghe
1964–1965: HC Torino
1965–1966: Amatori Cortina
1966–1967: HC Torino
1967–1968: Bruneck-Brunico
1968–1969: Bruneck-Brunico and HC Torino
1969–1970: Alleghe
1970–1971: Merano
1971–1972: SC Ritten-Renon
1972–1973: SC Ritten-Renon
1973–1974: Bolzano
1974–1975: Renon
1975–1976: Valpellice
1976–1977: Asiago and Turbine Milano
1977–1978: Merano
1978–1979: Bolzano
1979–1980: Selva
1980–1981: Selva
1981–1982: Fiemme
1982–1983: Fiemme
1983–1984: Auronzo
1984–1985: Fassa
1985–1986: Ritten-Renon
1986–1987: Fiemme
1987–1988: Milano Saima
1988–1989: Como
1989–1990: Cortina
1990–1991: Merano
1991–1992: Gherdëina-Gardena
1992–1993: CourmAosta
1993–1994: Cortina
1994–1995: Zoldo
1995–1996: Zoldo
1996–1997: Gherdëina-Gardena
1997–1998: Zoldo
1998–1999: Auronzo
1999–2000: Settequerce
2000–2001: Kaltern-Caldaro
2001–2002: Eppan-Appiano
2002–2003: Eppan-Appiano
2003–2004: Bressanone-Brixen
2004–2005: Vipiteno Broncos
2005–2006: Pontebba
2006–2007: Merano
2007–2008: Kaltern-Caldaro
2008–2009: Vipiteno Broncos
2009–2010: Eppan-Appiano
2010–2011: Vipiteno Broncos
2011–2012: Milano Rossoblu
2012–2013: Eppan-Appiano
2013–2014: Eppan-Appiano
2014–2015: Alleghe
2015–2016: Merano
2016–2017: Milano Rossoblu
2017–2018: Eppan-Appiano
2018–2019: SV Kaltern
2019–2020: not awarded
2020–2021: SV Kaltern

External links
 Federazione Italiana Sport del Ghiaccio
 Official statistics on powerhockey.info
 Lega Italiana Hockey Ghiaccio

2
1934 establishments in Italy
Sports leagues established in 1934
Ita